Etcherla Assembly constituency is a constituency in Srikakulam district of Andhra Pradesh. It is one of the seven assembly segments of Vizianagaram (Lok Sabha constituency), along with Rajam (SC), Bobbili, Cheepurupalli, Gajapathinagaram, Nellimarla and Vizianagaram. , there are a total of 231,279 electors in the constituency. Gorle Kiran Kumar is the present MLA of the constituency, who won the 2019 Andhra Pradesh Legislative Assembly election from YSR Congress Party.

Mandals 

The four mandals that form the assembly constituency are:

Members of Legislative Assembly Etcherla

Election results

Assembly Elections 2004

Assembly elections 2009

Assembly elections 2014

Assembly elections 2019

See also 
 List of constituencies of Andhra Pradesh Legislative Assembly

References 

Assembly constituencies of Andhra Pradesh